The Olonka is a river in the Republic of Karelia, Russia. It gave the name to the town of Olonets by the river and eventually to the surrounding territory (Olonets Governorate, Olonets Krai, now Olonetsky District). It flows out of the reservoir Utozero and discharges into Lake Ladoga.

The 1906 Russian Brockhaus and Efron Encyclopedic Dictionary writes that Olonka flows from Lake Topornoye, through lakes Vagvozero, Utozero and Torosozero, and eventually to Lake Ladoga. This section is now referred to as Topornaya (Топорная). The highest point of this drainage chain is Kaskozero, which overspills into Lake Pyyre Järvi (Pyureyarvi, Пюреярви), which is connected by a shallow creek to Topornoye.

Most important tributaries are Megrega (by Olonets) and Tuksa rivers.

References

Rivers of the Republic of Karelia